Wilhelm Gustav "Willi" Illbruck (September 26, 1927 – November 21, 2004) was a German industrialist, the founder and CEO of the Illbruck GmbH, and a notable yachtsman.

Career
After education as a toolmaker, military service as a 16-year-old boy in the German Navy during World War II and five years of  Soviet POW, he worked at the  German Railways and later in the cardboard industry.

On September 26, 1952, Willi and Christiane Illbruck founded a small business for the production of steel wool dies in Leverkusen-Opladen. At first, the 2-man business manufactured steel die-cutting tools and later plastic parts like platters, index tabs, lottery stencils etc. Within 20 years, the company had grown and established subsidiaries in Switzerland, Austria, France, Spain, Australia and the USA.

In 1980 Willi Illbruck OH was turned into an incorporated firm named Illbruck GmbH.

In 2000 Illbruck GmbH was a privately held international company with six autonomous business units: Automotive, Sealant Systems, Sanitary Technology, Architectural Surfaces, Filtration Systems/Insulation Systems and IT Services. Illbruck GmbH had 35 locations in 15 countries worldwide and was headquartered in Leverkusen, Germany. About 3,200 employees developed and produced customer-orientated, complex and highly sophisticated system solutions

Following Willi Illbruck's death in 2004 Illbruck GmbH was restructured into  Illbruck Sanitärtechnik GmbH, Pinta-Elements, Tremco Illbruck, Pinta Acoustics and RPM International Inc.

Personal life
Illbruck was married and has two children.

Yachting

In 1969, Illbruck named his first sailing yacht Pinta. The inspiration for the name was the historical Pinta, the fastest of the ships used by Christopher Columbus on his voyage to America. In the 1980s and 1990s, Illbruck dominated the German offshore yachting scene together with Udo Schütz and Hans-Otto Schumann. Illbruck and his yacht Pinta won the Admiral's Cup in 1983 and 1993 for Germany (skipper Russell Coutts ). The team also won the Sardinia Cup 1984.
Pinta won the One Ton Cup in 1993 (skipper Russell Coutts / helmsman Peter Lester) and 1994 (skipper John Kostecki / helmsman Rod Davis).

Illbruck’s unflagging drive and longstanding commitment to yachting were always a role model and incentive for his son Michael Illbruck and the crew members.

The Illbruck GmbH company was, under the leadership of his son, the main sponsor of the yacht Illbruck Challenge, the winner of the 2001–2002 Volvo Ocean Race (skipper John Kostecki).

Honors
On July 2, 1994, Illbruck and the Pinta crew was awarded with the Silberne Lorbeerblatt, the highest sports award in Germany.
On September 26, 2002, on his 75th birthday, Illbruck received the Bundesverdienstkreuz.

References

External links
 Pinta Racing website: Sailing History Retrieved May 3, 2012

1927 births
2004 deaths
German male sailors (sport)
Recipients of the Cross of the Order of Merit of the Federal Republic of Germany